Boga is a brand of Tunisian carbonated soft drinks, produced by the Société de Fabrication des Boissons de Tunisie (SFBT). The name "Boga" is the contraction of the French words for beverage "Boisson" and carbonated "Gazeuze". Boga is commercialized under 4 different flavors.

Flavors 
The Boga Lim is a non-colored version. This version is sweetened and has a lemon-lime flavor. Its taste is similar to drinks such as 7 Up or Ramune. Its packaging is recognized as being mainly green.

The Boga Light, has a similar flavor and appearance to the Boga Lim. However Boga Light is sweetened with an artificial sweetener instead of sugar. Its packaging is mainly blue.

The Boga Cidre, is a dark brown colored version. "Cidre" means cider in French, however it is not a cider made of apples but of carobs. This boga is described as having a very peculiar taste, close to banana or Root beer due to the carob extract it contains. Its packaging is mainly yellow.

The last version is the Boga Menthe. "Menthe" meaning mint in French. This version is bright green in color and is the association of the Boga Lim with mint syrup, giving it a distinctive mint-lime taste. Its packaging is mainly dark green.

See also

 List of soft drinks by country
 Tunisian cuisine

References 

Drink brands
Lemon-lime sodas
Soft drinks